Jorge Alberto Giacinti (born June 21, 1974 in Almafuerte, Córdoba) is a track and road cyclist from Argentina.

Career

1997
1st  National Road Race Championships
1998
1st Overall Vuelta Ciclista del Uruguay
1999
1st  National Road Race Championships
1st Overall Vuelta al Valle
2001
1st Overall Vuelta Ciclista Lider al Sur
2002
1st Stage 4 Volta do Rio de Janeiro
2003
3rd Overall Vuelta Ciclista de Chile
2004
1st Overall Vuelta Ciclista del Uruguay
1st Stage 1 Volta do Rio de Janeiro
2nd Overall Vuelta de San Juan
2005
1st Overall Volta de Ciclismo Internacional do Estado de São Paulo
1st Stage 6
1st Overall Volta Ciclistica de Porto Alegre
1st Stage 3
2006
2nd Overall Vuelta Ciclista de Chile
2nd Overall Volta Ciclistica Internacional do Paraná
3rd Overall Vuelta Ciclista Lider al Sur
1st Stage 3b (TTT)
3rd Overall Vuelta al Valle
2007
1st Overall Vuelta a Peru
1st Stages 1, 2, 3 & 5
1st Overall Tour de San Luis
1st Stage 3
1st Stage 6a Vuelta al Valle
2nd Overall Vuelta Ciclista Lider al Sur
1st Stage 2b
2008
1st Stage 3 Vuelta Ciclista del Uruguay
3rd National Time Trial Championships
3rd Overall Tour de San Luis
2009
2nd Overall Tour de San Luis
1st Stage 3
3rd Overall Giro del Sol San Juan
1st Stage 2
2013
Vuelta a Bolivia
1st Stages 3 (TTT) & 4
2014
2nd National Road Race Championships
3rd National Time Trial Championships

References
 

1974 births
Living people
Argentine male cyclists
Cyclists at the 2011 Pan American Games
Sportspeople from Córdoba Province, Argentina
Pan American Games competitors for Argentina
21st-century Argentine people